Howard "Happy" Goodman (November 7, 1921 – November 30, 2002) was an American gospel singer. In 1949, he founded the vocal group The Happy Goodman Family which included combinations of all eight Goodman siblings and his wife Vestal Goodman (née Freeman).

Early life
Howard was born on November 7, 1921, in Dora, Alabama, U.S., Howard was one of four children, Rusty, Bobby and Sam, who were both also in the Happy Goodman Family. He met his wife, Vestal Goodman, and got married in 1949.

Career
Howard began his career with his brothers, Sam and Rusty, performing Contemporary Christian and Southern gospel in the 1940s, followed by Vestal after getting married in 1949. Howard continued his southern gospel career until his death in 2002.

"Look for Me"
"Look for Me" was a song written by Rusty Goodman, and reperformed by Tanya Goodman Sykes, the daughter of Rusty Goodman.

Awards
 Grammy Award for Best Gospel/Contemporary Christian Music Performance (1969) 
 Grammy Award for Best Gospel Performance, Traditional (1979)

Death
Howard was hospitalized for seven months as a result of various complications following a knee surgery, He was undergoing therapy and rehabilitation when he developed pneumonia a week prior to his death. He died on November 30, 2002 in Nashville, Tennessee.

References

1921 births
Southern gospel performers
2002 deaths
People from Walker County, Alabama